Patricia Calles Villegas (born 19 July 1965) is a Mexican politician from the Institutional Revolutionary Party. In 2012 she served as Deputy of the LXI Legislature of the Mexican Congress representing Sonora.

References

1965 births
Living people
Politicians from Sonora
Women members of the Chamber of Deputies (Mexico)
Institutional Revolutionary Party politicians
21st-century Mexican politicians
21st-century Mexican women politicians
People from Guaymas
Deputies of the LXI Legislature of Mexico
Members of the Chamber of Deputies (Mexico) for Sonora